Starting with the arrival in China of the Jesuit China missions in 1552, the number of Western missionaries increased gradually. The Treaty of Tientsin in 1858 gave the Christians free run in the country and the right to purchase land to build. The Western missionaries saw themselves the God sent preachers while Chinese saw them as the barbarians (Chinese: 夷), the extension of foreign invasion, shielded by treaties and backed by their governments' gunboats. Anti missionary riots became part of the landscape, culminating the Boxer Rebellion in 1900.

List of anti-missionary riots

 29 August 1865, Youyang anti-missionary riot, Sichuan Province
 August 1868, Yangzhou riot, Jiangsu Province
 June 1870, Tianjin Massacre, Zhili Province
 1871, Anti-Missionary Movement, southern China
 30 August 1878, Foochow anti-missionary riot, Fujian Province
 1886, Chongqing anti-missionary riot (Chinese: 重庆教案), Sichuan Province
 May 1891, Anti-missionary riots in Wuhu, Anhui Province
 May 1895, Chengdu anti-missionary riot (Chinese: 成都教案), Sichuan Province
 1 August 1895, Kucheng massacre, Fujian Province
 Nov 1897, The Juye Incident (Chinese:  曹州教案 or 巨野教案), Shandong Province
 1899–1901, Boxer Rebellion, multiple locations

References

Christian missions in China
19th century in China
19th-century riots
Anti-Christian sentiment in Asia